Denis Vladimirovich Matrosov (born 10 December 1972) is a Russian actor of theatre and cinema, also known for his roles in several Russian TV series and for his activity as a TV and radio presenter and as a radio DJ.

Biography
Born on 10 December 1972 in Moscow, between 1979 and 1989 he attended School No. 34, a school providing intensive English classes.
Between 1989 - 1991 he was a student of the Acting Faculty of the Moscow Art Theatre School.
From 1991 to 1994, he studied at the Shepkin Higher Theatre Institute (N. A. Vereschenko’s course).

For one year, between 1994–1995, he completed his military service at the Theatre of the Russian Army, where he subsequently became an actor, working there for the following 8 years (until 2002).

Since 2002 he has been involved in several private theatrical enterprise projects.

Starting with February 2003 he plays the part of Lensky in the concert version of "Eugene Onegin" (by Pushkin) on Prokofiev’s music (conducted by Gerd Albrecht), touring in Vienna, Copenhagen and Moscow (Russian premiere on 10 May 2005).

He is married to Russian actress Maria Kulikova (since 2002).

Theatre Work 

1991 - 1994

 "Saturday, Sunday, and Monday" (by Eduardo De Filippo) – Attilio
 "Don Gil of the Green Breeches" (by Tirso De Molina) – Don Pedro
 "Fear and Misery of the Third Reich" (by Bertolt Brecht) – Traitor
 "Romeo and Juliet" (by William Shakespeare) – Romeo

1994 - 2002

 "Your Sister and Prisoner" – Earl of Leicester
 "Britannicus" – Nero
 "Paul the First" – Stepan
 "The Lady of the Camellias" – Gustave
 Musical "In the Busiest Place" – Senya
 Musical "The Wizard of Oz" – Toto
 "Chippolino" – Chippolino

Private Theatrical Enterprise Performances 

 "A Streetcar Named Desire" – Mitch
 "God Bless You, Monsieur!" – Atropos
 "Mad Weekend" – Frederic Walter
 "Khanuma" – Prince Kote Pantyashvily
 "Madness of Love" – Henry Boten
 "Piparkukas" – Anton

Since February 2003 – concert version of "Eugene Onegin" ( by Pushkin) on Prokofiev’s music ( conducted by Gerd Albrecht) – Lensky

Filmography 
 1990 — Made in USSR — Lyoha
 1996 — Love on a Raft — Mitya
 2001 — Dustman — croupier
 2001 — Stop on Demand 2 — card cheater
 2001 — Fatalists 
 2002 — Don't Even Think About It! — croupier
 2002 — Two Destinies — Vadim
 2003 — People and Shadows 2. Optical Illusion — Vitaly Litovtsev
 2003 — Give Me Life — Kostya
 2005 — Sunday in the Women's Bathhouse 
 2005 — Кarmelita — Аnton Astakhov
 2005 — My Love — Vadim Stroev
 2005 — New Russian Romance
 2006 — And Who Might You Be? — Victor
 2006 — Detectives - 5 — Fiodor Tochiltsev
 2007 — Squirrel on the Wheel — Кonstantin
 2007 — Hold Me Tight — Daniil
 2008 — Obsession — Dmitry Kolesnikov
 2008 — Jail Is Never Too Far — Vyacheslav
 2008 — Ukhnya 
 2009 — Karmelita. Gypsy Passion (Karmelita 2) — Аnton Astakhov
 2010 — Snowstorm 
 2010 — The Cuckoo

References

External links 
  Official site
 
 
 

1972 births
Living people
Russian television presenters
Male actors from Moscow
Russian male film actors
Russian male television actors